Garner E. Shriver (July 6, 1912 – March 1, 1998) was a U.S. Representative from Kansas.

Biography
Born in Towanda, Kansas, Shriver attended the public schools of Towanda and Wichita.
He moved to Wichita, Kansas, in 1925.
He was in the University of Wichita, B.A., 1934 (postgraduate study at University of Southern California in 1936), and Washburn Law School, LL.B., 1940 and J.D., 1970.
He worked for a drug company in Wichita from 1934 to 1936.
He was a teacher at South Haven High School in 1936 and 1937.
He was admitted to the bar in Wichita in February 1940.
He served for three years in the United States Navy as an enlisted man and officer from 1943 to 1946. He served in the Kansas House of Representatives from 1947 to 1951 and then in the Kansas Senate from 1953 to 1960.

Shriver was elected as a Republican to the Eighty-seventh and to the seven succeeding Congresses (January 3, 1961 – January 3, 1977). In 1974, Shriver won with about 49 percent of the vote in a three-way race.  He was an unsuccessful candidate for reelection in 1976 to the Ninety-fifth Congress.  He was defeated by Dan Glickman by three percentage points.

After losing reelection, he served as minority staff director and legal counsel for the Senate Veterans' Affairs Committee from March 1977 until 1980, and then the committee's general counsel from 1981 to 1982. He later resumed the practice of law and was a resident of Wichita, Kansas, until his death there on March 1, 1998.

References
 Retrieved on 2009-5-20

1912 births
1998 deaths
Republican Party Kansas state senators
Republican Party members of the Kansas House of Representatives
People from Towanda, Kansas
Politicians from Wichita, Kansas
United States Navy officers
University of Southern California alumni
Republican Party members of the United States House of Representatives from Kansas
20th-century American politicians